The 2017 Louisiana–Lafayette Ragin' Cajuns softball team represented the University of Louisiana at Lafayette in the 2017 NCAA Division I softball season. The Ragin' Cajuns play their home games at Lamson Park. This would also be the last season that a Lotief would be the head coach of the Ragin' Cajuns. This came after the university fired Lotief, both Malveauxs, Director of Operations Kelsey Vincent, and one manager, Sara Corbello on November 1, 2017 due to allegations of physically and verbal abuse to his players and for laying a finger on the university's strength coach. The Ragin' Cajuns softball players strongly disagreed with his firing. Several even transferred schools with most making a pack that "if they couldn't play with Lotief, they wouldn't play at all." However, most of the team remained and competed in 2018.  Nearly a year later, Lotief filed a lawsuit against the university claiming that they fired him over retaliation from Lotief claiming that the university violated NCAA Title IX laws which state that women's sports must be treated the same as their male counterpart. In the lawsuit, Lotief called University President Joseph E. Savoie, Athletic Director Bryan Maggard, and Assistant Athletic Director Dr. Jessica Leger as the defendants.

Preseason

Sun Belt Conference Coaches Poll
The Sun Belt Conference Coaches Poll was released on January 30, 2017. Louisiana-Lafayette was picked to finish first in the Sun Belt Conference with 100 votes and 10 first place votes, every first place vote available.

Preseason All-Sun Belt team
Ivie Drake (GSU, JR, Catcher)
Mandy Blackwell (GSU, SR, 1st Base)
Haley Hayden (ULL, SR, 2nd Base)
Kaleigh Todd (USA, JR, 2nd Base)
Sandra Mendoza (UTA, JR, 2nd Base)
DJ Sanders (ULL, JR, Shortstop)
Corrina Liscano (TXST, SR, 3rd Base)
Taty Forbes (CCU, SO, Outfield)
Aleah Craighton (ULL, JR, Outfield)
Rochelle Roberts (ULM, SR, Outfield)
Megan Litumbe (GSU, R-JR, Designated Player)
Dixie Raley (GASO, SO, Pitcher)
Alex Stewart (ULL, SR, Pitcher)
Devin Brown (USA, JR, Pitcher)
Randi Rupp (TXST, JR, Pitcher)

Preseason Player of the Year
Aleah Craighton (ULL, JR, Outfield)'

Roster

Coaching staff

Schedule and results

Baton Rouge Regional

References

Louisiana
Louisiana Ragin' Cajuns softball seasons
Louisiana softball